William John Button (30 November 1903 – 10 March 1969) was a British soldier and one of the last recipients of the Empire Gallantry Medal before this award was superseded by the George Cross.

In 1940, Button was a Lance-Sergeant in the Royal Engineers and was section leader of number 48 Bomb Disposal Section.  On 18 August 1940 L/Sgt Button and his men were excavating an unexploded bomb which had been dropped some days earlier.  While the section were digging the bomb exploded. Despite being injured himself Button's first concern was for his men and he ensured that the rest of the section were safe and accounted for before summoning help.

Button was recommended for an award and the award of the Empire Gallantry Medal was published in the London Gazette on 17 September 1940.  The citation read:

Button's award together with those awarded to fellow Royal Engineer Bomb Disposal personnel, Lt Edward Reynolds, 2nd Lt Ellis Talbot and 2nd Lt Wallace Andrews, were the last awards made of the Empire Gallantry Medal.  On 24 September 1940 King George VI initiated the George Cross (GC) and the first awards of the GC were published in the London Gazette on 30 September 1940.  Under the terms of the Royal Warrant for the GC, all EGMs were exchanged for a GC.

References

Recipients of the Empire Gallantry Medal
Royal Engineers soldiers
1969 deaths
Bomb disposal personnel
1903 births
People from Bath, Somerset